Joshua Lee Bell (born November 13, 1986) is an American former professional baseball player. A third baseman, Bell played in Major League Baseball (MLB) for the Baltimore Orioles and Arizona Diamondbacks from 2010 to 2012 and in the KBO League for the LG Twins in 2014.

Career

Los Angeles Dodgers
Bell was drafted by the Los Angeles Dodgers in the 4th round of the 2005 Major League Baseball draft out of Santaluces High School in Florida. After spending a year with the Gulf Coast Dodgers, he spent 2006 with the Ogden Raptors, where he batted .308 and was selected to the Pioneer League Post-Season All-Star team after he was third in the league in home runs, fourth in extra-base hits and fifth in RBIs. He split 2007 between the Great Lakes Loons and Inland Empire 66ers of San Bernardino.

Bell began 2008 with Inland Empire and played in 51 games for them before missing the rest of the season after undergoing preventive knee surgery in June. In 2009, he was promoted to the Double-A Chattanooga Lookouts where he was selected to the mid-season Southern League All-Star team. In the All-Star game, Bell was 2 for 4 with a homer and 2 RBIs and was voted the All-Star Game Most Valuable Player.

Baltimore Orioles
On July 30, 2009, he was traded to the Baltimore Orioles (along with Chattanooga teammate Steve Johnson) in exchange for relief pitcher George Sherrill.

On July 1, 2010, he was called up to replace Luke Scott, who hurt his left hamstring rounding the bases after a home run. Upon the trade of Miguel Tejada to the San Diego Padres on July 29, 2010, Bell took over the starting third basemen duties for the remainder of the 2010 season. In the spring of 2011, Bell was optioned to the Orioles Triple-A team in Norfolk.

On April 17, 2012. the Orioles designated Bell for assignment in a move that would make room for catcher Luis Exposito on the 40-man roster.

Arizona Diamondbacks
Bell was traded by the Orioles to the Arizona Diamondbacks for a player to be named later (PTBNL) or cash on April 21, 2012. Upon his acquisition, Bell was assigned to Triple A Reno and was recalled to the Diamondbacks on May 21 when Cody Ransom was designated for assignment by the team. The teams later agreed on Mike Belfiore as the PTBNL.

After hitting just .173 in 52 at-bats with a .501 OPS, Bell was outrighted off the Diamondbacks' 40-man roster at the conclusion of the season. He refused the assignment, however, and elected free agency.

Chicago White Sox
On January 10, 2013, Bell signed a minor league contract with the Chicago White Sox and was optioned to the Sox' AAA affiliate in Charlotte. On May 7 the White Sox released him. Through 55 at-bats, Bell hit .273/.310/.345.

New York Yankees
On May 17, Bell signed with the New York Yankees and was assigned to Triple-A Scranton/Wilkes-Barre. In 37 games, he hit .205 with 5HR and 17 RBI before being released on July 10.

LG Twins
He re-signed with the Dodgers on a minor league contract on December 16, 2013, but shortly afterwards chose to break that contract to sign with the LG Twins of the Korea Baseball Organization.

He was released from the team on July 2, 2014.

San Diego Padres
Bell signed a minor league deal with the Padres in February 2015. The Padres released him on May 25, having not played a game in the minors for the club.

Lancaster Barnstormers
On March 22, 2016, Bell signed with the Lancaster Barnstormers of the Atlantic League of Professional Baseball. He retired from active playing and was named hitting coach for Lancaster for the 2017 season. On May 18, 2017, Bell resigned with the Barnstormers. He became a free agent after the 2017 season. He re-signed with the team on June 6, 2018. He became a free agent after the season and re-signed with the team as a player-coach for the 2019 season.

References

External links

Minor League Baseball bio
Career statistics and player information from Korea Baseball Organization

1986 births
Living people
African-American baseball coaches
African-American baseball players
American expatriate baseball players in Mexico
American expatriate baseball players in South Korea
Arizona Diamondbacks players
Baltimore Orioles players
Baseball coaches from Illinois
Baseball players from Illinois
Bowie Baysox players
Charlotte Knights players
Chattanooga Lookouts players
Gigantes del Cibao players
American expatriate baseball players in the Dominican Republic
Great Lakes Loons players
Gulf Coast Dodgers players
Inland Empire 66ers of San Bernardino players
Lancaster Barnstormers players
LG Twins players
Major League Baseball third basemen
Mexican League baseball first basemen
Mexican League baseball third basemen
Norfolk Tides players
Ogden Raptors players
Reno Aces players
Rojos del Águila de Veracruz players
Scranton/Wilkes-Barre RailRiders players
Sportspeople from Rockford, Illinois
21st-century African-American sportspeople
20th-century African-American people